The WAGGGS-Asia Pacific Region is the divisional office of the World Association of Girl Guides and Girl Scouts, headquartered in Makati, Philippines; Australia; and Japan. The WAGGGS-Asia Pacific Region services Guiding in the land area of Asia south of Russia-in-Asia and the bulk of the Pacific Basin.

All the formerly communist states of Central Asia and the Soviet Union have developed or are developing Guiding in the wake of the renaissance in the region. For several years, communism repressed Guiding in Afghanistan, where it has newly returned, as well as in Mongolia, which had been the first Soviet satellite state since 1924. goru boi

This region is the counterpart of the Asia-Pacific Region of the World Organization of the Scout Movement (WOSM). No WAGGGS Region is corresponding to the World Organization of the Scout Movement Eurasian Region; post-soviet nations are divided between the WAGGGS-Europe Region and the WAGGGS-Asia Pacific Region.

Member organisations

Founding members
Twelve member organizations (from Australia, New Zealand, India, Malaysia, South Korea, Japan, Thailand, Taiwan, Sri Lanka, Singapore, Philippines, and Pakistan) formed the original Asia Pacific Region in 1969.

Full list of member organisations
The year in the 'date joined' column refers to the year the organization was granted membership to the Asia Pacific Region of WAGGGS, not the year Guiding started in that country.

See also

References

World Association of Girl Guides and Girl Scouts
Organizations based in Manila